Guttentag may refer to 

Dobrodzień, a town in Poland
Bill Guttentag, film writer, producer and director
Jack M. Guttentag, professor emeritus of finance